James Paul Moody (21 August 1887 – 15 April 1912) was the sixth officer of the  and the only junior officer to die when the ship sank on her maiden voyage.

Early life
James Paul Moody was born in Scarborough, England, on 21 August 1887, the youngest of four children born to solicitor John Henry Moody and his wife Evelyn Louis Lammin. Moody's grandfather and namesake, John James Paul Moody, had been Mayor of Scarborough. Moody attended the Rosebery House School, where he received a prestigious education, before joining the Navy training vessel HMS Conway as a cadet in 1902. His two years in the ship, 1902-1903, counted as one years' sea time towards his Board of Trade Second Mate's Certification.

Career 
In 1904 he joined the William Thomas Line's Boadicea as an apprentice, and endured a horrific, storm-troubled voyage to New York, in which one of his fellow apprentices was driven to suicide.

After attaining his Second Mate's Certification, Moody went into steam and sailed in cargo and early oil-tankers, eventually attaining his First Mate's Certificate. Moody was somewhat reluctant to accept the assignment as he had hoped to spend a summer on the Atlantic aboard the Oceanic, after having endured a harsh winter, and was also hoping to take leave. His request for leave was denied.

RMS Titanic
Along with the other junior officers, Moody received a message in March 1912 ordering him to report to White Star's Liverpool offices on 26 March. From there he travelled to board Titanic at the Harland & Wolff yard in Belfast. Titanic then sailed for Southampton to take on passengers. Moody's service as Sixth Officer earned him about $37 a month, although he was allowed his own cabin as compensation for his small salary.

On Titanics sailing day, 10 April, Moody assisted, among other things, in aiding Fifth Officer Harold Lowe in lowering two of the starboard lifeboats to satisfy the Board of Trade that Titanic met safety standards. He was also in charge of closing the last gangway, and most likely saved the lives of six crewmen who arrived too late to board by turning them away. Once the ship had put to sea, Moody stood the 4–5 PM watch and both 8–12 watches, which meant that he was on watch on the bridge with First Officer William Murdoch and Fourth Officer Joseph Boxhall when the Titanic struck an iceberg at 11:40 PM on 14 April. After spotting the iceberg, lookout Frederick Fleet rang the warning bell three times and phoned the bridge. It was Moody who answered the call, asking, "What do you see?" Fleet replied, "Iceberg, right ahead!".

In the ensuing evacuation, Moody helped in the loading of Lifeboats No. 9, 12, 13, 14, and 16. While loading No. 16, Moody ordered stewardess Violet Jessop into the boat. She described Moody as looking "weary and tired". Even so, he gave them a cheery smile, as he called out, "Good luck!", as he guided her and her cabin-mate into the boat; Moody then hailed her and gave her a baby to look after, saying, "Look after this, will you?". Moody then ordered the boat lowered away. While loading No. 14, Fifth Officer Lowe remarked that an officer should man the lifeboat. When Lowe asked Moody who it was to be—him or Moody—Moody insisted that Lowe should get onto the boat and that he would get on another one, saying "You go; I will get in another boat." Moody went to the starboard side and assisted Reginald Lee, who was Fleet's fellow lookout, in loading lifeboat No. 13, before ordering him to man it. 12-year-old Second Class passenger Ruth Becker was placed in this boat by Moody after being prevented from entering the heavily overloaded lifeboat number 11 which her mother and two siblings had boarded. Moody was last seen by the ship's lamp trimmer, Samuel Hemming, on top of the officers' quarters helping to lower Collapsible A, an emergency lifeboat, just before the ship began its final plunge. Hemming helped untangle the falls, and passed the block up to the roof. Moody called back down, "We don't want the block. We will leave the boat on deck." Collapsible Boat A reached the deck and was being attached to the falls when it was washed off Titanic by the wave washing over the boat deck. Lightoller, who was also on top of the quarters clearing away the collapsible boat on the port side, though he didn't recall seeing Moody, said that as those at collapsible A and B were engulfed when the water came up onto the boat deck and washed over the bridge, the same must have happened to Moody.

Moody was 24 at the time of his death. His body was never recovered. 

A monument in Dean Road / Manor Road Cemetery, Scarborough, commemorates Moody's sacrifice on the Titanic with the Biblical quote, "Greater love hath no man than this, that a man lay down his life for his friends." (see )

He is also commemorated by a Blue plaque at 17 Granville Road Scarborough, the house where he was born and a commemorative plaque in St Martin's Church in Scarborough.

He is also commemorated by a brass altar set presented by his aunt, Hannah Mountain, to the church of St Augustine of Hippo in Grimsby.

Portrayals
Michael Bryant (1958) — A Night to Remember (British film)
In the 1996 miniseries Titanic, the character of Moody is merged into that of Fourth Officer Joseph Boxhall, who is inaccurately portrayed as dying in the sinking.
Edward Fletcher (1997) (Titanic) 
Jonathan Howard (2012) (Titanic) (TV series/4 episodes)

References

External links

James Moody on Titanic-Titanic.com
All the Horrors Seem to Happen at Night

1887 births
1910s missing person cases
1912 deaths
British Merchant Navy officers
People educated aboard HMS Conway
Deaths from hypothermia
People from Scarborough, North Yorkshire
Deaths on the RMS Titanic